Gas Turbine power stations use gas combustion to generate some or all of the electricity they produce. Thermal Gas power stations use gas combustion to power steam turbines that generate some or all of the electricity they produce. Reciprocating Gas power stations use gas combustion in reciprocating engines to generate some or all of the electricity they produce.

New South Wales

Gas (Turbine)

Gas (Reciprocating) 

State Total (MW): 2129.7

Queensland

Gas (Turbine)

Gas (Reciprocating) 

State Total (MW): 3713.52

South Australia

Gas (Turbine) 

The two "temporary generation" facilities were introduced by the South Australian government before the 2017-18 summer season using General Electric gas turbine generators. They are intended to be used only in extreme circumstances to support the grid following two widespread blackouts in 2016. They are installed at the sites of the former Holden factory in Elizabeth South and the Adelaide Desalination Plant at Lonsdale.

Gas (Thermal)

Gas (Reciprocating) 

State Total (MW): 3519.7

Tasmania

Gas (Thermal)

Gas (Turbine) 

Note that the above three power stations are in fact the same power station listed upon commissioning after conversion to gas and recommissioning after a turbine upgrade.  It has been decommissioned since 2009.

Gas (Reciprocating) 

State Total (MW): 589.6

Victoria

Gas (Turbine)

Gas (Thermal)

Gas (Reciprocating) 

State Total (MW): 6946.33

Western Australia

Gas (Turbine)

Gas (Thermal)

Gas (Reciprocating) 

State Total (MW): 4541.02

See also 

 List of power stations in Australia
 List of coal power stations
 List of coal fired power stations in Australia
 List of largest power stations in the world

References 

Natural gas
Natural gas-fired power stations in Australia
Australia